Love Today is a 2022 Indian Tamil-language romantic comedy-drama film written and directed by Pradeep Ranganathan in his second directorial venture after Comali, and produced by Kalapathi S. Aghoram under the banner of AGS Entertainment. The film stars Pradeep Ranganathan himself (in his acting debut), Ivana, Raveena Ravi, Yogi Babu, Sathyaraj and Raadhika Sarathkumar in lead roles. The film's music and score is composed by Yuvan Shankar Raja, with cinematography handled by Dinesh Purushothaman and editing done by Pradeep E. Ragav.

Love Today was released theatrically on 4 November 2022, and received widespread critical acclaim  from critics and audience praising the direction, story, humour , score, social message and cast performances (particularly Ranganathan, Ivana, Yogi Babu and Raveena Ravi). The film was a critical and commercial success at the box office grossing ₹150 crores against a budget of ₹5 crore.

Plot
Uthaman Pradeep is a 24-year-old support engineer working at Cognizant in Chennai. He lives with his widowed mother Saraswathi and elder sister Divya. He is in a romantic relationship with Nikitha, a software engineer who is the daughter of Venu Sastri, a lawyer. They are a perfect couple, made for each other, and are ready to take their relationship to the next level i.e. marriage, but Pradeep hesitates a bit due to Nikitha's strict father. But Venu eventually finds out about his daughter's relationship with Pradeep and invites Pradeep over to his house, ostensibly to discuss about the marriage. However, during their meeting, Venu toys around with Pradeep and then proposes a strange deal with him; he should exchange his mobile phone with that of Nikitha's for a day, along with the respective mobile's screen lock. After the end of the period, if they still feel that they are in love, Venu will not object to their union, else they must go their separate ways. Both Pradeep and Nikitha agree to this decision half-heartedly and exchange their phones, but Pradeep deletes his WhatsApp messages before doing so.

Pradeep then returns home to manage Divya's upcoming marriage to Dr. Yogi, a dentist, which is to take place in four days time. On the goading of his friends, Pradeep goes through Nikitha's mobile phone, where he sees a WhatsApp conversation with Revi, Nikitha's boy best friend, who has a one-sided love for her. Pradeep is upset that Nikitha has a strong relationship with Revi, despite knowing about his one-sided love, and do many activities together. He further finds out that Nikitha is still friends with her ex-boyfriend Mamakutty and had gone on a night drive with him to Puducherry a few days earlier without his knowledge. He confronts Nikitha on both Revi and Mamakutty, leaving her in tears, and driving a wedge into their hitherto perfect relationship. The next day, Pradeep proposes to Venu that both he and Nikitha keep each other's phones until Divya's marriage is over, to know more about Nikitha's relationships, to which Venu agrees readily. However, unknown to Pradeep, Venu asks Nikitha to restore Pradeep's WhatsApp messages from backup to know about Pradeep's true colours.

Meanwhile, Divya and Yogi seem to get along very well, as Yogi is a cultured and mild-mannered man, who treats Divya as an equal, but Yogi is secretive regarding his mobile phone and does not let anyone, including Divya, touch or even come near him while he is using his phone, which upsets Divya and causes her to turn suspicious about him. She, her friends, as well as Pradeep, unsuccessfully try multiple times to get Yogi's phone, open it and check its contents. This further contributes to the growing wedge between her and Yogi.

Pradeep's and Nikitha's relationship worsens by the day, with Nikitha finding out about Pradeep's porn addiction as well as his conversations with multiple girls on WhatsApp, even managing to get them to send their photos based on the excuse of giving them an opportunity to act in a web series, but unknown to Nikitha, Pradeep has a second Instagram account on his phone, which he and his friends had created in college to message sexually explicit content using a fake female identity. The same account was used to perversely message Nikitha as well as her younger sister Shwetha (though Pradeep did not send the messages). Pradeep realises this and meets Nikitha at a restaurant to try and convince her to hand over his phone for an OTP to remove the account from his phone. But Revi, who has accompanied Nikitha, discovers the account and exposes Pradeep. This leads to a big fight between Nikitha and Pradeep, which ends with them breaking up. Further, Pradeep beats up Revi for interfering in their relationship, only to be stopped by the restaurant staff. He later suspects that his close friend Mani is behind the messages and fights with him as well, despite his pleas that he did not send the messages.

During Divya's wedding reception, Pradeep notices both Divya and Yogi arguing over the latter's phone secrecy, and in anger, he tries to snatch Yogi's phone, only to be angrily stopped by Saraswathi. Pradeep breaks down and reveals to her about his breakup. Saraswathi consoles him and tells him that trust in relationship is all that is needed, which he realises when he finds the tree he had struggled to grow in his childhood. Later, while smoking with Pradeep, Yogi reveals  that the reason he hesitates to share his phone is due to others mocking him for his appearance. He feared that if he had shared his phone with Divya, she would have rejected him as well. Divya overhears their conversation and, contrary to Yogi's fears, respects Yogi even more for his confession and they both reconcile, with Divya deciding not to look at Yogi's phone. Pradeep reconciles with Mani and his friends as well.

Meanwhile, a porn clip, apparently involving Nikitha, goes viral, causing Venu to assault and then disown her, despite her pleas that the video was doctored. Heartbroken, Nikitha leaves her house. Pradeep locates her sitting alone at a beach and consoles her. He reveals that he and his friends had managed to track the perpetrator of the video; Nikitha's publicity loving colleague Kaushik, who created a deepfake of Nikitha and inserted into a random porn video for the purpose of creating a trending video, and is arrested by the police. Pradeep and Nikitha reconcile and rekindle their relationship. Venu apologises to Nikitha for misunderstanding her and then reveals to her and Pradeep the real reason for the phone swap; he wanted to check how strong their relationship would be despite the hurdles, and informs that they have succeeded, thus approving their marriage. Later Venu meets Saraswathi and proposes that they exchange their phones for another test.

The movie ends with a message that trust is all that is needed in order to find peace in today's society.

Cast

 Pradeep Ranganathan as Uthaman Pradeep
 Master Mahanth as young Uthaman Pradeep
 Ivana as Nikitha  (Voice dubbed by Savitha Reddy)
 Yogi Babu as Dr. Yogi, Divya's fiancé
 Raveena Ravi as Divya, Uthaman Pradeep's sister and Dr. Yogi's fiancée
 Sathyaraj as Lawyer Venu Shastri, Nikitha's father
 Raadhika Sarathkumar as Saraswathi, Uthaman Pradeep and Divya's mother
 Akshaya Udayakumar as Shwetha, Nikitha's sister
 Finally Bharath as Mani, Uthaman Pradeep's best friend
 Adithya Kathir as "Olu" Bhaskar, Pradeep's friend
 Aajeedh Khalique as Revi, Nikitha's friend
 Vijay Varadaraj as Kaushik, Nikitha's co-worker
 Prathana Nathan as Namitha, Divya’s friend
 Gurubaai as Nikitha's Instagram follower
 Azhaar Ateef as Kaushik's office friend
 Navin Krubhakar as Mamakutty, Nikitha's ex-boyfriend
 Sandy Master as special appearance in the song "Saachitale"

Production

Development 
After the success of Comali, Pradeep Ranganathan announced his next project which would be produced by Kalapathi S. Aghoram under the banner of AGS Entertainment under the tentative title as AGS 22. It was reported that the project would be an adaptation of Pradeep Ranganathan's own short film App(a) Lock. Later, the title was announced to be Love Today, which was taken from the 1997 film of the same name starring Vijay and would mark Pradeep Ranganathan‘s debut as an actor in a leading role. The makers unveiled the first look poster of the film on 4 July 2022.

Casting 
Ivana who previously appeared in films like Naachiyaar and Hero was signed in to play the female lead, while Yogi Babu who previously collaborated with the director in Comali was signed on to play a supporting role while at the same time Raveena Ravi, veteran actor Sathyaraj and actress Radhika Sarathkumar were also confirmed to be a part of this film.

Filming 
The shooting of the film was reported to begin on December 2021. On 22 July 2022, it was announced that the entire shooting of the film was wrapped.

Music

The music and original score is composed by Yuvan Shankar Raja.

Release

Theatrical 
Love Today was released theatrically on 4 November 2022. The trailer of the film was released on 5 October 2022. The distribution rights of the film in Tamil Nadu were acquired by Udhayanidhi Stalin under the banner of Red Giant Movies. The film was distributed and released in the UK by Ahimsa Entertainment.

Home media 
The post-theatrical streaming rights of the film has been sold to Netflix, while the satellite rights of the film is sold to Kalaignar TV. The film was digitally streamed through the streaming platform on 2 December 2022 in Tamil language and in Telugu Malayalam,Kannada,Hindi as dubbed languages.

Reception

Critical response 
Love Today received widespread critical acclaim  from both critics and audience.

Logesh Balachandran of The Times of India rated 3.5 out of 5 stars and wrote "Overall, Love Today is an entertaining watch and is a perfect outing for the weekend." Vishal Menon of Film Companion wrote "But by settling for instant gratification from its comedy rather than investigating in its broader, more meaningful themes, Love Today too settles for the ordinary." Behindwoods rated 3 out of 5 and wrote that "Love Today's humour quotient and Yuvan music will make sure you go back home highly entertained." Bharath Vijayakumar of Moviecrow rated the film 3.25 out of 5 and wrote "Love Today is a lot of fun. The film also pleasantly surprises on how it tackles a very relevant topic of today." Vignesh Madhu of Cinema Express rated the film 3.5 out of 5 stars and wrote "It is a film about today's love, and Pradeep does a great job of ensuring that it’s a story for everyone." Srivatsan S of The Hindu wrote "For a film that claims to be about modern-day relationships, you scratch your head thinking if there is anything modern. But you cannot complain — the 2K Kids are entertained." Soundarya Athimuthu of The Quint gave the film’s rating 3 out of 5 and wrote "This new age romantic entertainer emphasizes the age-old fact that 'trust' is the foundation of a relationship." Kirubhakar Purushothaman of The Indian Express gave 3 out of 5 stars and wrote "The film conveniently deals only with softcore issues that are palatable for the mainstream audience… But what about their search history, their kinks, and the truths that only our mobile phones know? Maybe, those are too dark for this film, which wants to end on a rosy note." A critic from Behindwoods rated the film 3 out of 5 and wrote "Love Today's humour quotient and Yuvan music will make sure you go back home highly entertained." A critic for Cinema Vikatan wrote "In general, not only the lover, the beloved, but also the love changes its images and characteristics in all periods." Dinamalar rated the film 3.25 out of 5 stars. Akshay Kumar of DT Next gave 3.5 out of 5 gave the film’s rating 3.5 out of 5 and wrote "Love Today is unique for its light treatment while not getting restricted to being called a 'timepass' film." Thinkal Menon of OTT Play gave 3.5 out of 5 stars and wrote "Director-actor Pradeep had mentioned in one of his movie promotions that the film has been made for 2K kids. It looks like he is completely aware of his target audience and has exactly served what they need."

Box office 
On the first day of its release the film collected over 6 crores worldwide. After three days of its release, the film grossed over 19 crore at the box office. On the 11th day of its release, the film grossed 50 crores worldwide. On the first week of its release, the film grossed 70 crore at the worldwide box office. On 25 November 2022, it was reported from Pinkvilla that the film grossed over 50 crore from the state of Tamil Nadu. The film grossed over 150 crore against a budget of 5 crore and became one of the highest grossing Tamil films of 2022.

References

External links
 

Indian romantic comedy-drama films
2022 films
Films shot in Chennai
2022 romantic comedy-drama films
2020s Tamil-language films